Jahangir Khan Tareen is a Pakistani businessman and politician who is the majority shareholder and CEO of JDW Group, a conglomerate specialised in sugar manufacturing, biomass (bagasse) cogeneration, paper manufacturing, sugarcane farming, and aviation services. Jahangir Tareen is also the chairman and owner of JK Group, a conglomerate specialised in sugar manufacturing, milk production and processing, and sugarcane farming. He is also the chairman and owner of United Foods Pvt Ltd (Ali Tareen Farms, Lodhran) and Indus Mining. Khan has been a member of the National Assembly of Pakistan thrice between 2002 and 2017. Born in Comilla, Tareen was educated at the Forman Christian College in Lahore, and later attended the University of North Carolina. Prior to entering politics, he had been a lecturer and banker.

Tareen began his political career in 2002. He served as special adviser on agriculture and social sector initiatives to then Chief Minister of Punjab Chaudhry Pervaiz Elahi before being appointed the Federal Minister for Industries and Production where he served from 2004 to 2007 in the Shaukat Aziz ministry. In 2011, he joined PTI and became its General Secretary where he served until December 2017.

Tareen is one of the biggest tax payers in Pakistan.

Early life and education
Tareen was born on 4 July 1950 in Comilla, East Pakistan (now Bangladesh). He graduated from Forman Christian College, Lahore in 1971 and received an MBA degree from the University of North Carolina, USA, in 1974.

He is an entrepreneur by profession and prior to entering in politics, he had also been a lecturer, and a banker. He headed the Punjab Task Force on Agriculture from 1997 to 1999 and the Punjab Task Force on Wheat Procurement and Marketing from 2001 to 2002.

Tareen is considered one of the wealthiest politicians in Pakistan, with assets worth around Rs 400 billion; he owns thousands of acres of farmland and some of the largest sugar mills and many other business entities in Pakistan. He owns private planes which he often offers to PTI key leadership for traveling.

Political career
In an interview with Newsweek Pakistan, Tareen said "he doesn't belong to a political family, but he married into a political family".

He began his political career in 2002 after he was elected to the National Assembly in the 2002 Pakistani general elections from Constituency NA-195 on the ticket of Pakistan Muslim League (Q).

He served as special adviser on agriculture and social sector initiatives to then Chief Minister of Punjab Chaudhry Pervaiz Elahi. In August 2004, he was inducted into the federal cabinet and was made Federal Minister for Industries and Production in the Shaukat Aziz ministry where he remained until 2007. His sugar mills flourished during his tenure as Minister for Industries.

In the 2008 Pakistani general election, Tareen was re-elected as a member of the National Assembly for the second time from Constituency NA-195 on the seat of Pakistan Muslim League (F).

He was the parliamentary leader of PML-F in the National Assembly. Later he formed a forward block known as "Tareen's group" which comprised several seasoned politicians. In 2011, he said he was to launch his own political party consisting of politicians free from corruption charges. He later resigned from the National Assembly and in November 2011, joined Pakistan Tehreek-e-Insaf along with a number of associates, saying that his vision was similar to PTI's.

In September 2013, Imran Khan appointed Tareen as the Secretary General of Pakistan Tehreek-e-Insaf

In the 2013 Pakistani general election, Tareen ran for a seat on the National Assembly from Constituency NA-154 (Lodhran) on the seat of PTI, but was unsuccessful. Where has heavily invested.

In the 2015 by-elections, he was re-elected as a member of the National Assembly for the third time from Constituency NA-154 (Lodhran) on the seat of PTI. The seat became vacant after Tareen filed a petition in which he made accusations of irregularities in the constituency during the 2013 general election.

Controversies
In 2016, PML-N filed a reference to disqualify Tareen from his National Assembly seat for "submitting false statements with the Election Commission of Pakistan". In 2017, ECP rejected disqualification references against Tareen.

On 15 December 2017, the Supreme Court of Pakistan disqualified Tareen from serving as a member of parliament under Article 62(1)(f) of the Constitution due to dishonesty in financial declarations. It also noted that he had engaged in conduct that could have been prosecuted as insider trading, but he was protected from such prosecution due to a settlement with the Securities and Exchange Commission of Pakistan. A subsequent judgment held that disqualification under Article 62(1)(f) is for life, but Tareen claimed that this judgment did not apply in his case.

References

External links
 

1953 births
Living people
Pashtun people
Pakistani industrialists
Pakistani MNAs 2002–2007
Pakistani MNAs 2008–2013
Pakistani MNAs 2013–2018
Expelled members of the National Assembly of Pakistan
Pakistan Muslim League (Q) MNAs
Pakistan Muslim League (F) politicians
Pakistan Tehreek-e-Insaf MNAs
Forman Christian College alumni
People from Lodhran District
University of North Carolina alumni